There have been seven baronetcies created for persons with the surname Lawrence, one in the Baronetage of England, one in the Baronetage of Great Britain and five in the Baronetage of the United Kingdom.

The Lawrence Baronetcy, of Iver in the County of Buckingham, was created in the Baronetage of England on 9 October 1628 for John Lawrence. The title became extinct on the death of the third Baronet in 1714.

The Lawrence Baronetcy of St Ives, Huntingdonshire, later the Woollaston Baronetcy, of Loseby (Lowesby Hall) in the County of Leicester, was created in the Baronetage of Great Britain on 17 January 1748. For more information on this creation, see Woollaston baronets. The 1st Baronet bore the same arms as the Lawrence Baronets of Iver in the County of Buckingham: Argent, a cross raguly gules on a chief of the last a lion passant gardant or.

The Lawrence Baronetcy, of Lucknow, was created in the Baronetage of the United Kingdom on 10 August 1858 for Alexander Hutchinson Lawrence, with remainder, failing male issue of his own, to his younger brother. The title was in honour of his father Sir Henry Montgomery Lawrence, who died during the Siege of Lucknow in 1857.

The Lawrence Baronetcy, of the Army, was created in the Baronetage of the United Kingdom on 16 August 1858 for John Lawrence. He was the uncle of the first Baronet of the Lawrence Baronetcy of Lucknow. For more information on this creation, see the Baron Lawrence.

The Lawrence Baronetcy, of Ealing Park in the County of Middlesex, was created in the Baronetage of the United Kingdom on 30 April 1867 for William Lawrence, FRS, Serjeant-Surgeon to Queen Victoria. The second Baronet, Sir Trevor Lawrence, sat as Member of Parliament for Surrey Mid and Reigate and was a noted horticulturalist. The third Baronet was like his father a horticulturalist, a hospital administrator, and a collector. The fourth Baronet worked in industry in the Midlands. The fifth Baronet was a former chairman of Stratford-on-Avon council and former chairman of the Heart of England Tourist Board.

The Lawrence Baronetcy, of Westbourne Terrace, was created in the Baronetage of the United Kingdom on 16 December 1869 for James Lawrence. He was Lord Mayor of London from 1868 to 1869 and also represented Lambeth in the House of Commons. The title became extinct on his death in 1897.

The Lawrence Baronetcy, of Sloane Gardens in Chelsea, was created in the Baronetage of the United Kingdom on 13 July 1906 for the administrator Walter Lawrence. He was Private Secretary to the Viceroy of India from 1898 to 1905 and a member of the Council of India.

Lawrence baronets, of Iver (1628)
Sir John Lawrence, 1st Baronet (–1638)
Sir John Lawrence, 2nd Baronet (11 May 1610 – 1658)
Sir Thomas Lawrence, 3rd Baronet (–1714)

Lawrence, later Woollaston baronets, of Loseby (1748)
see Woollaston baronets

Lawrence baronets, of Lucknow (1858)
Sir Alexander Hutchinson Lawrence, 1st Baronet (1838–1864)
Sir Henry Hayes Lawrence, 2nd Baronet (1864–1898)
Sir Henry Waldemar Lawrence, 3rd Baronet (1845–1908)
Sir Alexander Waldemar Lawrence, 4th Baronet (1874–1939)
Sir Henry Eustace Waldemar Lawrence, 5th Baronet (1905–1967)
Sir John Waldemar Lawrence, 6th Baronet (1907–1999)
Sir Henry Peter Lawrence, 7th Baronet (born 1952)

The heir apparent is the present holder's son Christopher Cosmo Lawrence (born 1979).

Lawrence baronets, of the Army (1858)
see the Baron Lawrence

Lawrence baronets, of Ealing Park (1867)

Sir William Lawrence, 1st Baronet (1783–1867)
Sir James John Trevor Lawrence, 2nd Baronet (1831–1913)
Sir William Matthew Trevor Lawrence, 3rd Baronet (1870–1934)
Sir William Lawrence, 4th Baronet (1913–1986)
Sir William Fettiplace Lawrence, 5th Baronet (1954–2015)
Sir Aubrey Lyttelton Simon Lawrence, 6th Baronet (born 1942)

The heir apparent is the current holder's son Thomas Lyttelton de Froidmont Lawrence (born 1985).

Lawrence baronets, of Westbourne Terrace (1869)
Sir James Clarke Lawrence, 1st Baronet (1820–1897)

Lawrence baronets, of Sloane Gardens (1906)
Sir Walter Roper Lawrence, 1st Baronet (1857–1940)
Sir Percy Roland Bradford Lawrence, 2nd Baronet (1886–1950)
Sir David Roland Walter Lawrence, 3rd Baronet (1929–2002)
Sir Clive Wyndham Lawrence, 4th Baronet (born 1939)

The heir apparent is the present holder's son James Wyndham Stuart Lawrence (born 1970).

Notes

References
Kidd, Charles, Williamson, David (editors). Debrett's Peerage and Baronetage (1990 edition). New York: St Martin's Press, 1990, 

Baronetcies in the Baronetage of the United Kingdom
Extinct baronetcies in the Baronetage of England
Extinct baronetcies in the Baronetage of Great Britain
Extinct baronetcies in the Baronetage of the United Kingdom
Baronetcies created with special remainders